The 2009–10 Louisiana Tech Bulldogs basketball team represented Louisiana Tech University in the 2009–10 men's college basketball season. This was Kerry Rupp's 3rd season as head coach. The Bulldogs played their home games at Thomas Assembly Center and compete in the Western Athletic Conference. They finished the season 24–11, 9–7 in WAC play and lost in the semifinals of the 2010 WAC men's basketball tournament. They were invited to the 2010 CollegeInsider.com Tournament where they advanced to the quarterfinals before falling to Missouri State.

Pre-season
In the WAC preseason polls, released October 20 via media teleconference La Tech was selected to finish 5th in the coaches poll and 6th in the media poll. Sr. Kyle Gibson was selected to the coaches All-WAC second team.

2009–10 Team

Roster
Source

Coaching staff

2009–10 schedule and results
Source
All times are Central

|-
!colspan=9| Exhibition

|-
!colspan=9| Regular Season

|-
!colspan=9| 2010 WAC men's basketball tournament

|-
!colspan=10| 2010 CollegeInsider.com Tournament

Season highlights
On December 7, Sr. Kyle Gibson was named the WAC player of the week for the fourth week of the season with weekly averages of 27.5 PPG, 6.5 RPG, 4.0 AST, 1.5 Steals and 59.3 FG%.

On January 4, So. Olu Ashaolu was named the WAC player of the week for the eighth week of the season with weekly averages of 15.5 PPG, 16.5 RPG, 1.5 AST, 0.5 Steals and 52.4 FG%.

See also
Louisiana Tech Bulldogs basketball
2009–10 WAC men's basketball season

References

Louisiana Tech
Louisiana Tech Bulldogs basketball seasons
Louisiana Tech
2010 in sports in Louisiana
2009 in sports in Louisiana